Delta is an unincorporated community in Carrier Mills Township, Saline County, Illinois, United States.

References

Unincorporated communities in Saline County, Illinois
Unincorporated communities in Illinois